Natalie Rogers (1928–2015) was an early contributor to the field of humanistic psychology and the founder of Person-Centered Expressive Arts.  This combination of the arts with psychotherapy is sometimes referred to by Rogers as The Creative Connection. The daughter of Carl Rogers, one of the founders of humanistic psychology, she established her own center, the Person-Centered Expressive Therapy Institute. Her writings, teachings, and practice introduced many to the power of creative arts for healing both within and outside the therapeutic setting.

Early life and education 
Natalie Rogers was born to Carl Rogers and Helen Elliot. Along with her brother David, she describes growing up in a house that encouraged creativity with her mother being an at home mom who taught them and supported their art. She attended private schools as a child, growing up mostly in New York and Ohio. At the age of twenty-one, she married Larry H Fuchs and went on to have three daughters. Early in her career she worked in a psychiatric clinic, as a therapist with children, and at a college counseling center before entering private practice. In 1970, she divorced and moved to California to establish her own therapeutic practice. Her book, Emerging Woman describes her own journey to womanhood in midlife.

Career 
A contribution of Roger's Person-Centered Expressive arts therapy is the incorporation of other forms of expression beyond traditional art to include movement and psychodrama. Her work in developing expressive arts therapy expanded upon traditional views of art therapy as pertaining to drawing, painting, and sculpture to include other modalities of art including dance, movement, poetry and drama into the therapeutic process. For twenty years she trained therapists in person-centered expressive arts therapy at her institute and through institutions she was affiliated with as a faculty member.

Person-centered expressive arts therapy 
Practitioners of Person-Centered Expressive art therapy, which was developed by Natalie Rogers, describe using the expressive arts to help clients approach both their conscious and unconscious to promote healing and growth. The role of the therapist is to provide a caring and positive attitude toward the client and help the client work through negative feelings through the process. Like other Humanistic therapeutic approaches, the therapist shows unconditional positive regard to the client. Expressive Arts workshops involve participating in the process that Natalie Rogers described as The Creative Connection. This combines multiple forms of self-expression with an end goal of achieving new levels of personal development. The person-centered aspect of the therapy refers to the role of the therapist in creating a safe environment for clients to engage in symbolic expression through the arts. The therapist listens without judgment or criticism and creates a space for further self-exploration and encourages the client to engage in stimulating or challenging experiences.

Encounter groups 
In the 1970s, Natalie Rogers, assisted her father in leading Person-Centered encounter groups. Encounter groups are described as large workshops of eighty (80) to one hundred and fifty (150) people with a goal of not just personal growth but larger social transformation. These groups aimed to apply person-centered techniques beyond one-on-one therapeutic scenarios to large group settings. Person-Centered Approach (PCA) Encounter groups involved a great deal of pre-planning and facilitation by carefully selected staff. These workshops were conducted in several countries and sometimes sought to address larger social and political issues of the time.

Selected works 

 The Creative Connection for Groups (2011)
 The Creative Connection: Expressive Arts as Healing (1993)
 Emerging Woman: A Decade of Midlife Transitions (1980): Emerging woman is a feminist book that is Natalie Rogers on account of her transitions from twenty years as a wife and a mother of her own independent person.

Awards and recognitions 

 Rogers was recognized with a Lifetime Achievement award in 1993 from the International Expressive Arts Therapy Association
 Carl Rogers Award from the Society for Humanistic Psychology (Division 32 of the American Psychological Association) in 2015
 This award is "given to an individual for an outstanding contribution to the theory and practice of humanistic psychology," with other recipients including E. Mark Stern and Jules Seeman.

References 

1927 births
2015 deaths
Humanistic psychologists
Psychotherapy